This is a list of music videos by the German musical project Enigma.

MCMXC a.D.

The Cross of Changes

Le Roi Est Mort, Vive Le Roi!

The Screen Behind the Mirror

Love Sensuality Devotion: The Greatest Hits

Voyageur
The third single from the album, "Following the Sun", is the only Enigma single not to have a music video accompanied with it.

15 Years After

A Posteriori
The album was released in DVD form in December 2006, which features the entire album in 5.1 surround with only galactic images in kaleidoscope style and geometric patters.

Seven Lives, Many Faces

MMX (The Social Song)

The Fall of a Rebel Angel

Additional information
Label:
Virgin
Catalog#:
50999 227124 9 3
Format:
DVD, DVD-Video, Album, PAL, Regionfree
Country:
Europe
Released:
28 Nov 2008
Genre:
Electronic, Pop, Rock, Stage & Screen
Style:
New Age, Abstract, Disco, Lo-Fi, Ambient

Artwork By - Dirk Rudolph
Film Director [Director] - Thomas Job (2)
Other Artist [Photos] - Rosemary Robenn, Vinod Kotiya
Producer - Michael Cretu
Written-By, Lyrics By - Andru Donalds (tracks: 8,9), Margarita Roig (tracks: 7,11), Michael Cretu (tracks: 1-13)

Comes in standard (black) DVD-case with insert.
Contains audio comments by Michael Cretu (Germany/English)

Aspect ratio: 4:3
Audio formats: Stereo, DD5.1, DTS5.1
Running time: approximately 47:37

The aspect ratio is misprinted on the release because it is 16:9 with 4:3 picture.

All songs published by 1-2-3 Music / Crocodile Music.
(P) 2008 The copyright in this audiovisual recording is owned by Baloo Music S.A. under exclusive licence to Virgin Music, a division of EMI Music Germany GmbH & Co. KG
(C) 2008 EMI Music Germany GmbH & Co. KG

Made in the EU.
Labelcode: LC 03098
Barcode: 5 099922 712493
Disc-Matrix: D851458-01 / 2271249

Notes

References

 EnigmaMusic.com (Dec. 8, 2003). Boum Boum Remixers and Video Director Confirmed. Retrieved May 20, 2006.
 Joar Grimstvedt (Jan. 1, 2006). Enigma: 15 Years After (boxset). Retrieved May 20, 2006.
 Adrian Rode, Marcin Papke (May. 15, 2006). EnigmaCretu.com - Howard Greenhalgh (Exclusive Interview). Retrieved May 20, 2006.
 Joar Grimstvedt (Jan 25, 1994). Enigma: MCMXC a.D. - The Complete Video Album. Retrieved Oct 27, 2006.
 Joar Grimstvedt (Nov 21, 1999). News archive 1999. Retrieved Oct 27, 2006.
 The Enigma Lair (2003). People. Retrieved Oct 27, 2006.

Videography
Videographies of German artists